Lube may refer to:

Lubricant, a substance (usually a liquid) introduced between two moving surfaces to reduce the friction and wear between
more specifically, in colloquial usage, personal lubricant

Places
Lube Parish, an administrative unit in Latvia
Lubě, a municipality and village in the Czech Republic
Lube, a village in the commune of Coslédaà-Lube-Boast in France

Companies and organizations
Lube Motorcycles, former Spanish motorcycle manufacturer, based in Bilbao
Mr. Lube, Canadian chain of quick oil change garages
Lubeh, a Russian band, sometimes romanized as Lube
Volley Lube, an Italian volleyball club

See also

Lubricant (disambiguation)